Eddie Palmieri (born December 15, 1936) is an American Grammy Award-winning pianist, bandleader, musician, and composer of Puerto Rican ancestry. He is the founder of the bands La Perfecta, La Perfecta II, and Harlem River Drive.

Early life
Palmieri's parents moved to New York from Ponce, Puerto Rico, in 1926 and settled in the South Bronx, a largely Jewish neighborhood. There, he and his elder brother Charlie Palmieri were born. He accompanied Charlie and participated in many talent contests when he was eight years old.

Palmieri continued his education in the city's public school system where he was constantly exposed to jazz music. He took piano lessons and performed at Carnegie Hall at the age of eleven. Influenced by Thelonious Monk and McCoy Tyner, and  inspired by his older brother, he determined to someday form his own band — which he accomplished in 1950 when he was fourteen years old. During the 1950s, Palmieri played in several bands including Tito Rodríguez's.

First recordings
In 1961, Palmieri founded the band Conjunto La Perfecta, which featured singer Ismael Quintana. Apart from the big bands, at the beginning of the decade the Pachanga was the Latin dance craze. Essential to the Charanga style is the five key wooden flute and at least two violins. Palmieri decided to replace the violins with two trombones for a heavier sound.

Two key elements to the 'Palmieri' sound were trombonists Barry Rogers (who was very influential as well as guitarist Bob Bianco, with whom Palmieri studied harmony to the fourth chords sound that Palmieri is known for) and Brazilian-born José Rodrígues. Together they were responsible for many of the 'head' arrangements, mambos and moñas that the band recorded. George Castro (flute), Manny Oquendo (bongó and timbales), Tommy López (conga) and Dave Pérez (bass) rounded out the group. To this day, the group is known as one of the swingingest, most danceable, innovative and influential groups of that period.

Palmieri experimented by including a touch of jazz in his recordings, and incorporating a popular Cuban rhythm known as mozambique. Lo Que Traigo Es Sabroso (What I Bring is Saucy) and Mozambique are just two examples of his use of this rhythm. Seeking a bigger and punchier sound, Palmieri disbanded the band in 1968.

In 1971, Palmieri recorded Vamonos Pa'l Monte (Let's go to the Mountain) with his brother Charlie at the organ.  That same year he also recorded Eddie Palmieri & Friends in Concert, At the University of Puerto Rico.  In 1975, Palmieri won the first Grammy Award for Best Latin Recording with The Sun of Latin Music (produced by Harvey Averne and arranged by René Hernández, long-time pianist with the orchestra led by Machito, and Barry Rogers (Un Día Bonito)). On July 21, 1979, he appeared at the Amandla Festival along with Bob Marley, Dick Gregory and Patti LaBelle, among others.

In the 1980s, Ismael Quintana returned to the band, which also included Cheo Feliciano.  Palmieri won two Grammys for the recordings of Palo Pa' Rumba and Solito.  He also recorded the album La Verdad (The Truth) with salsa singer Tony Vega in 1987. The next year, his brother  Charlie died suddenly.

In the 1990s, Palmieri had participated in various concerts and recordings with the Fania All-Stars and the Tico All-Stars; he also introduced La India with the production of Llegó La India via Eddie Palmieri (La India has arrived via Eddie Palmieri), released in 1992. In 1998, Palmieri received an honorary doctorate from the Berklee College of Music. In 2000, Palmieri announced his retirement from the world of music.  However, he recorded Masterpiece with Tito Puente and won two Grammys; additionally he was also named the "Outstanding Producer of the Year" by the National Foundation of Popular Culture. Palmieri has won a total of 9 Grammy Awards in his career, most recently for his 2006 album Simpático. On November 6, 2004, Palmieri directed a "Big Band Tribute" to his late brother Charlie at Avery Hall at the Lincoln Center for the Performing Arts.

La Perfecta

Palmieri's La Perfecta departed from the traditional Cuban sources of salsa instrumentation by introducing a new stylistic device into the New York Latin sound. Their signature sound relied heavily on two trombones and a flute instead of trumpets. On the liner notes of their first album, Eddie's brother Charlie dubbed this combination the 'trombanga', referring to the trombones and the still popular charanga which typically featured the flute. The combination helped to give La Perfecta a rich and bold sound which contributed to Palmieri's success with his new band. The trombone-based sound was later adopted by salsa band leaders Willie Colón and Manny Oquendo, among others.

La Perfecta II
Palmieri formed a new band, La Perfecta II, with whom he recorded the CD Ritmo Caliente (Hot Rhythm). On April 30, 2005, "Mi Día Bonito", a tribute to Eddie Palmieri celebrating his 50 years in the world of music, took place at the Rubén Rodríguez Coliseum in Bayamón, Puerto Rico.  The event included the participation of Lalo Rodríguez, Ismael Quintana, Cheo Feliciano, La India, Hermán Olivera, Jerry Medina, Luis Vergara and Wichy Camacho.

In November and December 2005, Palmieri teamed up with longtime trumpeter and band member Brian Lynch to record the Artistshare CD release The Brian Lynch/Eddie Palmieri Project: Simpático. This CD and accompanying multimedia web site features music by an all-star roster of jazz and Latin jazz artists, including Phil Woods, Lila Downs, Donald Harrison, Conrad Herwig, Giovanni Hidalgo, Gregory Tardy, Mario Rivera, Boris Kozlov, Rubén Rodríguez, Luques Curtis, Robby Ameen, Dafnis Prieto, Pedro Martínez, Johnny Rivero, Edsel Gómez, Yosvany Terry.  In 2007, the recording was awarded a Grammy as the best Latin Jazz Recording.

Back in the studio
Palmieri returned to the studio to record three songs for the soundtrack to Doin' it in the Park: Pickup Basketball NYC.  The documentary, co-directed by Bobbito García and Kevin Couliau, explores the relationship between NYC playgrounds, basketball, arts and culture. In 2022, Eddie Palmieri appeared in a feature-length documentary titled Santos - Skin to Skin.

Discography

 La Perfecta (Alegre, 1962)
 El molestoso (Alegre, 1963)
 Lo que traigo es sabroso (Alegre, 1964)
 Echando pa'lante (Straight Ahead) (Tico, 1964)
 Azúcar pa' ti (Sugar for You) (Tico, 1965)
 Mambo con conga es Mozambique (Tico, 1965)
 El Sonido Nuevo (Verve, 1966) – with Cal Tjader
 Bamboléate (Tico, 1967) – with Cal Tjader
 Molasses (Tico, 1967)
 Champagne (Tico, 1968)
 Justicia (Tico, 1969)
 Superimposition (Tico, 1970)
 Vamonos pa'l monte (Tico, 1971)
 In Concert at the University of Puerto Rico (Coco, 1971)
 Harlem River Drive (Roulette, 1971) – with Harlem River Drive
 Recorded Live at Sing Sing Vol. 1 (Tico, 1972) – with Harlem River Drive
 Recorded Live at Sing Sing Vol. 2 (Tico, 1972, released 1974)
 Sentido (Coco/Mango, 1973)
 Sun of Latin Music (Coco, 1974) – with Lalo Rodríguez
 Unfinished Masterpiece (Coco, 1975)
 Eddie's Concerto (Tico, 1976)
 Festival 76 (Coco, 1976)
 Lucumí, Macumba, Voodoo (Epic, 1978)
 Eddie Palmieri (Barbaro, 1980)
 Timeless (Coco, 1981)
 Palo pa' rumba (Musica Latina International, 1984)
 Solito (Musica Latina International, 1985)
 The Truth / La verdad (Fania, 1987)
 Sueño (Intuition, 1989)
 Llegó La India Via Eddie Palmieri (Soho Sounds, 1992) – with La India
 Palmas (Elektra Nonesuch, 1994)
 Arete (RMM, 1995)
 Vortex (1996)
 El rumbero del piano (RMM, 1998)
 Live (1999)
 Masterpiece / Obra maestra (RMM/Universal, 2000) – with Tito Puente
 En Vivo Italia (2002)
 La Perfecta II (Concord, 2002)
 Ritmo caliente (Concord Picante, 2003)
 Listen Here! (Concord Picante, 2005)
 Simpático (ArtistShare, 2006) – with Brian Lynch
 Eddie Palmieri Is Doin' It in the Park (2013)
 Sabiduría / Wisdom (2017)
 Full Circle (Uprising, 2018)
 Mi Luz Mayor (2018)

See also
 List of Puerto Ricans
 Corsican immigration to Puerto Rico
Charlie Palmieri

References

External links
  – official site
 
 Eddie Palmieri at warr.org

1936 births
American bandleaders
American people of Corsican descent
American people of Puerto Rican descent
American salsa musicians
Fania Records artists
Grammy Award winners
Latin Grammy Award winners
Latin Grammy Lifetime Achievement Award winners
Latin jazz musicians
Latin jazz pianists
Living people
RMM Records artists
Salsa
ArtistShare artists
Ropeadope Records artists
Concord Records artists